Textadept is a free software minimalist text editor designed for computer programming. Distributed under the MIT license, it is written in C and Lua and is extensible using Lua. Textadept can use either a graphical user interface or a text-based user interface when running in a terminal window. Textadept uses the Scintilla editing component. Textadept's developer makes the curses wrapper library for Scintilla used by Textadept available separately.

In common with Emacs, Textadept is deeply extensible; the Lua API has access to any subsystem of the program. Despite this, the developer states that one of his goals is for the C portion to not exceed 2000 lines of code and for the Lua portion to never exceed 4000 LOC. When running in a graphical interface Textadept purposely does not save window size or position, leaving this up to the window manager.

See also 

 List of text editors
 Comparison of text editors

References

External links
 Textadept home page
 Webupd8 review
 Free software directory entry
 Textredux, a module providing text-based interfaces for core Textadept functionality
 Textadept Language Lexers, Impression and tips on extending language support

Free text editors
Unix text editors
MacOS text editors
Windows text editors
Linux text editors
Free software programmed in C
Free software programmed in Lua (programming language)
Text editors
 
Software using the MIT license